Admiral Raden Subyakto (14 July 1917 – 12 August 1999) was Chief of Staff of the Indonesian Navy from 1948 to 1959. His appointment was part of a process of reorganization and rationalization of the Indonesian Armed Forces under Prime Minister Mohammad Hatta's policies.

Profile
Raden Subyakto completed his basic education at a Hollandsch-Inlandsche School (HIS) an elementary school for natives in 1930, after that he continued to MULO in 1933, AMS in 1935, and finally at Middled Lands School in 1941 and on April 1, 1941, R. Subyakto started working at the ASP ADJ Viiteru Consultant located in Ambarawa, then on April 1, 1942, he became an Aspirant Reserve of the Royal Netherlands Navy, and lastly March 1, 1943, served as Lieutenant Second Class of Royal Netherlands Navy Reserves, continuing his studies at Koninklijke Marine Institute (K.M) and finished in 1943.

At the beginning of the formation of the Indonesian Navy and the war of Indonesian independence, R. Soebijakto was actively involved because he was Dutch educated at KIM-V and was appointed on May 8, 1948, to serve as Chief of Staff of the Indonesian Navy.

As a personnel with educational background in the Dutch Navy, on January 1, 1950, R. Subyakto gained the rank of Colonel, four years later, on April 1, 1954, gained the rank of Rear Admiral, he continued to climb the ranks, and on July 9, 1954, he was promoted to Vice Admiral. From November 25, 1955, traveled abroad to Italy, Switzerland, West Germany, Australia, Belgium, France, United Kingdom, Canada, Japan and the US to learn to build up the Indonesian Navy.

On May 17, 1959, he became a high-ranking officer at the Ministry of Foreign Affairs. On September 1, 1959, he became the Ambassador of the Republic of Indonesia to Turkey in Ankara for approximately 6 years he was transferred on January 1, 1965, and served as the Indonesian ambassador to Yugoslavia in Belgrade until January 1, 1966. On 27 April 1971 he became Admiral of the Indonesia Navy, until his retirement in 1973.

Raden Subyakto died on August 12, 1999, and was later buried at Kalibata Heroes Cemetery with a military ceremony.

References 

1917 births
1999 deaths